East Beach Café is a  seafront cafe in Littlehampton, West Sussex, United Kingdom. It is owned by Jane Wood and Sophie Murray, who commissioned designer Thomas Heatherwick to create an iconic building for the seaside town of Littlehampton.

Architecture 

The cafe was designed by award-winning designer Thomas Heatherwick, and was his first building. The unconventional silhouette was designed to protect views from a nearby conservation area while offering sea views for customers.

It was built in Littlehampton, with steelwork by Littlehampton Welding ltd and site work by Langridge Developments, another local firm.

The building won a RIBA regional prize in 2008, judges describing it as "both strange and captivating; weird but lovable". In 2009 the Restaurant and Bar Design Awards awarded East Beach Cafe winner of the Exterior Space category. East Beach Cafe was awarded Coastal Cafe of the Year by National Magazine Company's Coast Awards in 2011.

See also
 List of bakery cafés

References

External links
 

Bakery cafés
Buildings and structures in West Sussex
Littlehampton
Coffeehouses and cafés in the United Kingdom